Waimate North is a small settlement in Northland, New Zealand. It is situated between Kerikeri and Lake Ōmāpere, west of the Bay of Islands.

It was one of the earliest centres of European settlement and features the second-oldest surviving European building in New Zealand, at Te Waimate Mission.

History

Pre-European history

Okuratope Pā was situated here and was the home to chief Te Hotete (father of Hongi Hika) of the Ngai Tawake hapū in the late 18th-early 19th centuries. A major disturbance took place here in 1800, when an attacking Ngare Raumati war party from Rāwhiti murdered and ate chief Te Maoi's wife, Te Auparo as well as their daughter, Te Karehu. This led to revenge attacks, which lasted over two decades; and resulted in the comprehensive defeat of the Ngare Raumati and the conquest of their lands by Ngāpuhi (including Te Maoi and Te Auparo's three chiefly sons; Te Wharerahi, Rewa, and Moka Te Kainga-mataa.

European settlement

Te Waimate Mission was the fourth mission station established in New Zealand, and the first settlement inland from the Bay of Islands. The members of the Church Missionary Society (CMS) appointed to establish the mission were the Rev. William Yate and lay members Richard Davis, George Clarke and James Hamlin.

The first European wedding in New Zealand was conducted on 11 October 1831 at the  St. John the Baptist Church, when William Gilbert Puckey (26), son of a Missionary carpenter, William Puckey, married Matilda Elizabeth Davis (17), second daughter of the Missionary Rev. Richard Davis.

During the Flagstaff War (1845-1846) casualties of the Battle of Ōhaeawai were buried in the church yard of Church of St John the Baptist, including Captain Grant of the 58th Regiment and Lieutenant George Phillpotts of HMS Hazard. The mission station was used as the headquarters for the British army, after which the mission lost support among Māori. The mission station gradually fell into disrepair and the buildings were subsequently put up for sale. Today the only remnant on the site is the house originally occupied by George Clarke, which is preserved by Heritage New Zealand as a museum.

Modern history

The existing  St. John the Baptist Church at Waimate North was built in 1870 and 1871.

Waimate North Christian School closed in 2005.

Marae

The local Tauwhara Marae and Te Rangiawhiowhio meeting house is a traditional meeting ground for the Ngāpuhi hapū of Ngāi Tāwake, Ngāti Hineira, Ngāti Rēhia, Ngāti Tawake ki te Tuawhenua and Whānautara.

In October 2020, the Government committed $500,000 from the Provincial Growth Fund to upgrade the marae, creating 29 jobs.

Demographics
The SA1 area is part of the larger Ōhaeawai-Waimate North statistical area.

The SA1 statistical area had a population of 213 at the 2018 New Zealand census, an increase of 39 people (22.4%) since the 2013 census, and an increase of 42 people (24.6%) since the 2006 census. There were 78 households, comprising 105 males and 105 females, giving a sex ratio of 1.0 males per female. The median age was 51.0 years (compared with 37.4 years nationally), with 30 people (14.1%) aged under 15 years, 33 (15.5%) aged 15 to 29, 99 (46.5%) aged 30 to 64, and 54 (25.4%) aged 65 or older.

Ethnicities were 80.3% European/Pākehā, 31.0% Māori, 1.4% Pacific peoples, 1.4% Asian, and 1.4% other ethnicities. People may identify with more than one ethnicity.

Although some people chose not to answer the census's question about religious affiliation, 47.9% had no religion, 40.8% were Christian, 4.2% had Māori religious beliefs, 1.4% were Buddhist and 1.4% had other religions.

Of those at least 15 years old, 39 (21.3%) people had a bachelor's or higher degree, and 33 (18.0%) people had no formal qualifications. The median income was $29,600, compared with $31,800 nationally. 24 people (13.1%) earned over $70,000 compared to 17.2% nationally. The employment status of those at least 15 was that 93 (50.8%) people were employed full-time, 30 (16.4%) were part-time, and 6 (3.3%) were unemployed.

References

Far North District
Populated places in the Northland Region